María Cristina Muñoz y Borbón (19 April 1840 - 20 December 1921) was a Spanish aristocrat, 1st Marquise of la Isabela.

Biography 
Born on 19 April 1840 in the Royal Palace of Madrid, she was the uterine sister of Queen Isabella II, one the children conceived in the marriage between Queen Regent Maria Christina and her morganatic husband Agustín Fernando Muñoz y Sánchez, 1st Duke of Riánsares.

She was granted the titles of Viscountess of La Dehesilla and the title of Marchioness of La Isabela in 1847.
 
She married in the Malmaison on 20 October 1860 José María Bernaldo de Quirós y González de Cienfuegos, 8th Marquis of Campo Sagrado, whom with she had 3 surviving children: Jesús María, Ana Germana and María de los Desamparados.

She died in  22, Madrid on 20 December 1921.

She is an ancestor of Íñigo Méndez de Vigo and Carlos Espinosa de los Monteros.

Ancestry

References 

Marquesses of Spain
1840 births
1921 deaths